Sarjubala Devi (born 1 March 1993) is an Indian woman boxer from Manipur and represented India at the 2016 Rio Olympics. After being awarded as the Best Boxer at Youth World Women Boxing Championship organised at Turkey, the Olympic Gold Quest (OGQ) announced support for Sarjubala Devi in 2012. She is referred to as the next Mary Kom. She used to be part of the 48 kg category but recently changed it to 51 kg category. After the change she claimed a Gold Medal at the National Women's Boxing Championship 2018 (Fly category). She also won the Best Boxer award at the 7th Youth Women National Championship in Patiala and in the 14th Senior Women Boxing Competition.

Early life and career
Sarjubala Devi was born in a farmer's family to Sh Rajen Singh and Thoibi Devi. Being inspired by the stories of Mary Kom's success, she joined boxing school in 2005. Two years later, she joined the Sports Authority of India training centre in her city, Imphal India. Before winning Silver at the Junior Nationals she won the Sub-Junior Women National Championships both in years 2006 and 2008. She won the World Youth Championship in 2011 and later went on to win the Senior National Championship the same year. She has also participated in the 11th Senior Women National Boxing Championship in 2011.

Devi did not make it past the quarterfinals stage at the 2016 Rio Olympics. She also represented India at the Asian Games 2018 but was knocked out during the quarterfinals against China's Chang Yuan.

In February 2022 Devi had her first professional boxing match against Lulu Kayage of Tanzania. The match took place in Dubai. This was Kayage's seventeenth professional match but Devi won by a unanimous decision in what was reported as a one-sided match.

Achievements
Sarjubala Devi is an honourable boxer, some of her achievements in the field of boxing are:

References

Indian women boxers
1993 births
Living people
Sportswomen from Manipur
AIBA Women's World Boxing Championships medalists
People from Thoubal district
Boxers from Manipur
Boxers at the 2018 Asian Games
Asian Games competitors for India
Light-flyweight boxers
21st-century Indian women